Edisonia Hall was a generic name for exhibition halls that displayed the various inventions of Thomas Alva Edison's company. These included the phonograph, the Vitascope, the Kinetoscope and other such devices.

The Edisonia Hall opened by Mitchell Mark and Moe Mark in Buffalo, New York in the Ellicott Square Building on October 19, 1896, had the distinction of hosting a Vitascope Theater (or "Theatre").  This was the first known dedicated, purpose-built motion picture theater in the world.  The theater was referred to in newspapers of the day (Buffalo Express, Buffalo News, and others) as Vitascope Theater, Vitascope Hall, and the Electrical Theater.

The majority of the first program of films were Lumiere Films obtained through Pathe Freres.  In its first year of existence, more than 200,000 people visited to view motion pictures projected on a screen.  The theater remained open for nearly two years, longer than any other early motion picture theater known. On November 25, 2007, the Buffalo News published an article by Mark Sommer confirming the historical significance of this theater.

References
Notes

Sources
 Buffalo Express 1886-10-19.
 Ramsaye, Terry. A Million and One Nights: A History of the Motion Picture (Abingdon, UK: Frank Cass, 2012) [original edition: New York: Simon and Schuster, 1926]
 Sandhu, Ranjit. History of Buffalo Theaters; unpublished manuscript, collection Buffalo and Erie County Public Library,  Grosvenor Room.
 Sommer, Mark. "Another groundbreaker for Buffalo: The nation's first motion picture theater may have been in Ellicott Square" Buffalo [NY] News 2007-11-25.
 Sommer, Mark. "Scholars say movie theater debuted here" Buffalo [NY] News 2008-10-19.

External links 
Cinema Treasures Historic Listing
"Mitchel and Moe Mark and Edisonia Hall in Buffalo" Buffalo Architecture and History website. Extensive references and photos.

Tourist attractions in Buffalo, New York
Cinemas and movie theaters in New York (state)
Former cinemas in the United States